The Houston Whiteside Historic District in Hutchinson, Kansas is a  historic district which was listed on the National Register of Historic Places in 2004.

The district is roughly bounded by the BNSF Railway tracks on the north, by Pershing St. on the east, by East Ave. B and East Ave. A on the south, and by Plum and South Elm on the west.  It included 175 contributing buildings and two contributing structures.

Atchison, Topeka, and Santa Fe Railroad tracks run through the district.

"Key Contributing" properties in the district include:
402 E. First Avenue (c. 1890s), a two-story Queen Anne house with multiple gable-on-hip roofs
John Nelson House (c. 1898), 407 E. First Avenue, an elaborate Second Empire house.

References

National Register of Historic Places in Reno County, Kansas
Historic districts on the National Register of Historic Places in Kansas
Victorian architecture in Kansas